Anjukunnu (or Anchukunnu) is a village in Wayanad district in the state of Kerala, India.

Demographics
 India census, Anjukunnu had a population of 18049 with 9167 males and 8882 females.

Ancient history 
Anjukunnu is the modern name of Payal Hills. Around Christian Era it was ruled by a Chera King by name ‘Vanjan’, a philanthropist.

Etymology
Anjukunnu aka Anchukunnu means five hills in Malayalam language. Anjukunnu is a village which has five hills:
Kallumottamkunnu
Kakkanchirakunnu
Kappumkunnu
Vilakkupadamkunnu
Kacherikunnu

Library
A famous public library with A Grade of Kerala State Library Council (Reg. No. 12 MDY 2469), "Pothujana Grandhalayam" situated in Anjukunnu.

Transportation
Anchukunnucan be accessed from Mananthavady or Kalpetta. The Periya ghat road connects Mananthavady to Kannur and Thalassery.  The Thamarassery mountain road connects Calicut with Kalpetta. The Kuttiady mountain road connects Vatakara with Kalpetta and Mananthavady. The Palchuram mountain road connects Kannur and Iritty with Mananthavady.  The road from Nilambur to Ooty is also connected to Wayanad through the village of Meppadi.

The nearest railway station is at Mysore and the nearest airports are Kozhikode International Airport-120 km, Bengaluru International Airport-290 km, and   Kannur International Airport, 58 km.

We must travel 10 kilometres from Mananthavady, 24 kilometres from Kalpetta, 28 kilometres from Sulthan Bathery and 97 kilometres from Kozhikode to reach Anjukunnu.

References

Villages in Wayanad district
Panamaram area